Events in the year 1820 in Art.

Events

April 8 - The Venus de Milo is discovered on the island of Melos (Greek: Milos).
Publication of William Blake's prophetic book Jerusalem: The Emanation of the Giant Albion (colored engravings) is completed in London (commenced 1804).

Works
William Blake – The Ghost of a Flea
Augustus Wall Callcott – A Dead Calm on the Medway
Antonio Canova – George Washington (installed in the North Carolina State House in 1821 – destroyed by fire-induced structural collapse in 1831)
John Constable – Harwich Lighthouse
Johan Christian Dahl – View from a Window at Quisisana
William Etty
Female Nude in a Landscape
Francisco Goya – Self-portrait with Dr Arrieta
Francesco Hayez - Pietro Rossi
George Hayter
Portrait of Lord Holland
Venus supported by Iris, complaining to Mars
Thomas Luny – Bombardment of Algiers
Jean-Baptiste Regnault
The Judgement of Paris (approximate date)
Love and Hymen drinking from the cup of Friendship (Musée Bossuet, Meaux)

John Trumbull – Surrender of Lord Cornwallis
David Wilkie – Reading the Will

Births
February 18 – Pierre Alexandre Schoenewerk, French sculptor (died 1885)
February 28 – John Tenniel, English illustrator (died 1914)
April 6 – Nadar, French photographer and caricaturist (died 1910)
May 12 – Josef Mánes, Czech painter (died 1871)
July 9 – John Wright Oakes, English landscape painter (died 1887)
July 25 – Henry Doulton, English potter (died 1897)
November 23 – Ludwig von Hagn, German painter (died 1898)
December – Eugène Fromentin, French painter (died 1876)
December 16 – George Scharf, English art critic and curator (died 1895)
date unknown – John Frederick Herring, Jr., English sporting and equestrian painter (died 1897)

Deaths
January 29 – George III of the United Kingdom, patron of the arts and collector (born 1738)
March 8 – Kitao Shigemasa, Japanese ukiyo-e artist from Edo (born 1739)
March 9 – Hermanus Numan, Dutch artist, art theorist, and publisher (born 1744)
March 11 – Benjamin West, American-born English painter (born 1738)
March 27 – Gerhard von Kügelgen, German painter of portraits and history paintings (born 1772)
May 17 – Vincenzo Brenna, Italian painter and house architect of Paul I of Russia (born 1747)
May 26 – Antonio Longo, Italian priest and painter (born 1742)
September 15 – Okada Beisanjin, Japanese painter (born 1744)
October 10 – Uragami Gyokudō, Japanese musician, painter, poet and calligrapher (born 1745)
 date unknown
 Pietro Bonato, Italian painter and engraver (born 1765)
 Jean Simeon Rousseau de la Rottiere, French decorative painter (born 1747)
 Quirinus van Amelsfoort, Dutch allegorical, historical and portrait painter (born 1760)

References

 
Years of the 19th century in art
1820s in art